The 1978 NBA All-Star Game was an exhibition basketball game which was played on February 5, 1978, at the Omni Coliseum in Atlanta.

Coaches: East: Billy Cunningham, West: Jack Ramsay.
Officials: Jake O'Donnell and Jim Capers
MVP: Randy Smith
Attendance: 15,491

Teams

Western Conference

Eastern Conference

Score by periods

References 

Events in Atlanta
National Basketball Association All-Star Game
All-Star